The United States County Board of the Gaelic Athletic Association or USGAA, is one of the 3 county boards of the Gaelic Athletic Association (GAA) in North America, and is responsible for Gaelic games in the United States (except for the New York metropolitan area, which is administrated by the New York GAA). The county board is also responsible for the United States county teams.

History
Hurling and Gaelic football have been played in North America ever since Irish immigrants began landing on North American shores. The earliest games of hurling in North America were played in St. John's, Newfoundland in 1788, and there are records of football being played in Hyde Park (now the site of the Civic Center) in San Francisco as early as the 1850s. There are established clubs in the cities that traditionally have a large Irish population, such as New York, Chicago, Philadelphia, San Francisco, and Boston.

When the North American county board was formed it included Canadian clubs in its area of control. However these clubs are now under the control of the Canadian county board.

In recent years, hurling has started to enjoy support in several other U.S. cities, as evidenced by the establishment of the Milwaukee Hurling Club in 1995 and later the Twin Cities Hurling Club (MN). Other clubs include the Indianapolis Hurling Club, the St. Louis Gaelic Athletic Club, the Denver Gaels, the Greenville Gaels, the Orlando Hurling Club and the Seattle Gaels.  Hurling is also starting to gather support at the club level at some universities, such as at Purdue University and Stanford University since 2005, California State University, Monterey Bay since 2006, and UC Berkeley since 2008.

Interest in Gaelic Football has also developed amongst universities in America.  Saint Joseph's University in Philadelphia is the first school to have an officially recognized program after running independently since 2011. Boston College's program has been running since 2011, while two other Philadelphia-area institutions, Villanova University and Drexel University, hope to launch club programs soon.

As of 2017 more than 51% of registered players in the United States were born there. This number is an underestimation as many clubs do not register all players that select to play only local games.

Early 21st century
The GAA in North America became the victim of two major developments in the early 21st century.  One was the security clampdown that followed the 9/11 terrorist attacks, and the other was the massive growth in the Irish 'Celtic Tiger' economy.  These two factors led to a reduction in the number of people travelling from Ireland to the U.S., and it became difficult for many Irish people to stay in the country illegally. Additionally, many Irish emigrants returned to Ireland, where they enjoyed a high standard of living that wasn't available to earlier generations. These factors reduced the number of people playing GAA in larger U.S. cities. The trend was partially offset by growth in smaller cities. With the onset of economic crisis of the late 2000s the flow of emigrants back to Ireland and into America has changed once again but current U.S. immigration policies have meant that the number of Irish that used to go to America is not now the same.

Grassroots development is taking on a life of its own. Youth programs are springing up across the country and in particular are experiencing huge growth thanks to the success of the Continental Youth Championship.

Competitions

USGAA Finals 
Each year on Labor Day weekend, the USGAA holds a championship between the clubs in all U.S. cities where there are GAA-affiliated clubs (except for New York city). Playoffs are held between the Gaelic football, hurling and camogie champions of the different regions in the United States, to determine the USGAA champions. Play off locations:
2019 Mid Atlantic Division (Leesburg, VA - DC Area)
2018 Philadelphia
2017 San Francisco
2016 Seattle
2015 Chicago
2014 Boston
2013 Cleveland
2012 Philadelphia
2011 San Francisco
2010 Chicago
2009 Boston
2008 Boston
2007 Chicago
2006 Philadelphia
2005 Philadelphia
2004 Denver
2003 Boston
2002 Chicago
2001 San Francisco
2000 Boston
1999 Chicago
1998 Rockville, MD (near Washington DC)
1997 San Francisco
1996 Boston

Grades 
The championships are divided into different grades.

Men:
 USGAA Senior Football Championship
 USGAA Intermediate Football Championship
 USGAA Junior A Football Championship
 USGAA Junior B Football Championship
 USGAA Junior C Football Championship
 USGAA Junior D Football Championship
 USGAA Senior Hurling Championship
 USGAA Junior A Hurling Championship
 USGAA Junior B Hurling Championship
 USGAA Junior C Hurling Championship
 USGAA Junior D Hurling Championship
Ladies:
 USGAA Senior Ladies Football Championship
 USGAA Intermediate Ladies Football Championship
 USGAA Junior A Ladies Football Championship
 USGAA Junior B Ladies Football Championship
 USGAA Senior Camogie Championship
 USGAA Junior Camogie Championship

The Continental Youth Championships

The Continental Youth Championship (CYC) began in 2004, hosted by the New York GAA.  This is an annual weekend tournament that takes place in various cities from year to year. The most recent CYC was held in August 2018, contested in Canton, Massachusetts, and hosted by the Boston GAA. CYC involves under age teams from all three of the GAA jurisdictions in North America playing football, hurling, ladies' football, and camogie at all ages from Under 8 to Under 18.

Clubs
In 2015 in the USGAA area, there were 116 adult clubs and 14 Youth clubs playing Football, Hurling or Camogie in the US outside New York City. These clubs participated in Divisional Championship competitions to qualify for the USGAA Finals in their respective sport and grade of competition. As of 2017, Gaelic games were being organized and played in over 60 cities across the US, including:
Akron, Allentown PA, Albany, Albuquerque, Atlanta, Austin
Baltimore, Boston, Buffalo, Burlingame
Charleston, Charlotte, Chicago, Cincinnati, Cleveland, Coastal Virginia (Norfolk/Virginia Beach), Columbia, Columbus
Cayman Islands
Dallas, Denver, Detroit
Fairfax VA
Greenville, South Carolina
Hartford, Huntington Beach, Houston
Kansas City, Kalamazoo, Knoxville
Indianapolis
Los Angeles, Louisville
Madison, Memphis, Milwaukee
Nashville, Naperville, New Hampshire, New Orleans
Oakland, Orlando
Philadelphia, Phoenix, Pittsburgh, Portland, Portland ME
Richmond VA, Rochester, Raleigh NC
San Antonio, St. Louis, St. Paul MN, San Diego, San Francisco, San Jose, Seattle, South Bend, Syracuse
Tampa FL, Tacoma, Twin Cities
Waukesha, Washington DC, Worcester, MA, Winston-Salem NC

List of clubs

See List of GAA clubs in North America

References

External links
 USGAA
 The Continental Youth Championships
 Gaelic Football, Hurling are Irish Passions, National Geographic News
 Hurling, Men's Fitness Magazine